Elizabeth Ann Schmidt (born August 23, 1977) is an American former professional tennis player.

Schmidt, who was raised in Austin, played collegiate tennis for the UCLA Bruins from 1996–97 to 1999–00, earning All-American honors for doubles as a freshman.

Graduating in 2000, Schmidt spent the next four years on the professional tour and reached a best singles ranking of 380 in the world. As a doubles player she was ranked as high as 137, with her doubles highlights including a WTA Tour semi-final appearance at Québec City in 2002 and participation in Wimbledon qualifying in 2003.

Since 2008 she has served as the head coach of women's tennis at Rice University.

ITF finals

Doubles: 7 (1–6)

References

External links
 
 

1977 births
Living people
American female tennis players
UCLA Bruins women's tennis players
Rice Owls coaches
College tennis coaches in the United States
American tennis coaches
Tennis players from Austin, Texas
Sportspeople from Kansas City, Missouri